Matchstick Men is a 2003 black comedy film directed by Ridley Scott and based on Eric Garcia's 2002 novel of the same name. The film stars Nicolas Cage, Sam Rockwell, and Alison Lohman. The film premiered on September 2, 2003 at the 60th Venice International Film Festival and was released in the United States on September 12, 2003. It received generally positive reviews and grossed $65 million against its $62 million budget.

Plot
Roy Waller is a con artist from Los Angeles with severe tourette's syndrome and obsessive-compulsive disorder. Alongside his partner and protégé Frank Mercer, Roy runs short cons, selling overpriced water filtration systems to unsuspecting customers. After Roy experiences a violent panic attack, Frank suggests he see a psychiatrist, Dr. Harris Klein.

Klein provides Roy with medication, and in therapy has Roy recall his past relationship with Heather, his ex-wife who was pregnant during the divorce. At Roy's behest, Klein informs Roy he called Heather, finding out Roy has a 14-year-old daughter, Angela. Roy and Angela meet, and her youthful energy rejuvenates him. Jubilant, he agrees to work with Frank on a long con; their target is Chuck Frechette, an arrogant businessman whom they plan to con using the pigeon drop.

One night, Angela shows up at Roy's, saying she has had a fight with her mother, deciding to stay for the weekend before returning to school. Exploring his belongings, she causes him to rethink his life, which he mentions during therapy with Klein. Angela returns home late one night, leading to an argument between them. During dinner, Roy admits he is a con artist and reluctantly agrees to teach Angela a con. They go to a local laundromat and con an older woman into believing she has won the lottery, so she shares half of her expected winnings with Angela; however, Roy then forces Angela to return the money.

Roy goes bowling with Angela but is interrupted when Frank reveals that Chuck's flight to the Caymans has been updated to that day instead of Friday as planned. With little time, Roy reluctantly lets Angela distract Chuck midway through the con; however, after the con is finished, Chuck realizes what has happened and chases them into a parking garage before they escape. Roy then discovers Angela was arrested a year earlier and asks her to stop calling him.

Without Angela, Roy's myriad phobias resurface, and during another panic attack, he ultimately learns that the medication given to him by Klein is a placebo. He proclaims he needs Angela in his life but that he would have to change his lifestyle, much to Frank's disappointment. Roy and Angela return from dinner one night to find Chuck waiting for them with a gun, alongside a badly beaten Frank. Angela shoots Chuck and Roy sends her off with Frank into hiding until the matter can be sorted out. As Roy prepares to take care of Chuck's body, Chuck suddenly springs to life and knocks Roy unconscious.

Roy awakens in a hospital, where the police inform him that Chuck died from the gunshot and Frank and Angela have disappeared. Klein appears and Roy gives him the password to his large safety deposit box, ordering him to give the money to Angela when she is found. Later, Roy awakens to find the "police" have disappeared, his "hospital room" is actually a freight container on the roof of a parking garage, "Dr. Klein's" office is vacant, and his very substantial cash savings has been taken. He begins to realize Frank pulled a long-con on him. Roy drives over to Heather's (whom he hasn't seen for years) looking for Angela. Roy learns the truth: Heather miscarried their child. There is no "Angela": the young woman he thought was his child was actually Frank's accomplice.

One year later, Roy has become a salesman at a local carpet store, which Angela and her boyfriend one day wander into. Roy confronts her, who is much older than he had thought, but ultimately forgives her, realizing that he is much happier as an honest man. Angela reveals she did not receive her fair share of the cut from Frank, and that it was the only con she ever pulled. Angela says “I’ll see you, Dad” when she and her boyfriend depart. Roy returns home to his new wife Kathy, who is pregnant with his child.

Cast

 Nicolas Cage as Roy Waller
 Sam Rockwell as Frank Mercer
 Alison Lohman as Angela
 Bruce Altman as Dr. Harris Klein
 Bruce McGill as Chuck Frechette
 Sheila Kelley as Kathy
 Beth Grant as Laundry Lady
 Melora Walters as Heather, Roy's Former Wife (uncredited)
 Jenny O'Hara as Mrs. Schaffer
 Steve Eastin as Mr. Schaffer
 Fran Kranz as Slacker Boyfriend
 Tim Kelleher as Bishop
 Tim Maculan as Pharmacist #2
 Giannina Facio as Bank Teller
 Sonya Eddy as Parking Garage Cashier
 Jim Zulevic as Bartender

Release
Opening in 2,711 theaters in the United States and Canada, the film's opening weekend gross stood at second place with $13.0 million for a per-theater-average of $4,827; it ultimately lost the number-one position to Once Upon a Time in Mexico. The film eventually grossed $36.9 million domestically, and $65.5 million worldwide.

Reception
 

Roger Ebert rated the film four stars (out of four) and described it as "so absorbing that whenever it cuts away from the plot, there is another, better plot to cut to." He also recommended the film for several Oscar nominations, most notably Nicolas Cage's performance and the film's screenplay. James Berardinelli awarded the film three-and-a-half stars (out of four), praising the film for its "sly, biting sense of humor" and "emotionally satisfying" elements. He also praised the film's acting, and ultimately noted that the film was "worth every cent" of the ticket price and was "the first winner of the fall movie season."

Some critics were not impressed. Renee Graham of The Boston Globe criticized the film for its sentimentality, writing that "director Ridley Scott goes all gooey in this off-key adaptation of Eric Garcia's cynical novel." Despite praising the performances of Sam Rockwell and Alison Lohman, Graham was not fond of Cage, writing that he is more "irritating than interesting" and that the film follows a similar style. Similarly, Lou Lumenick of the New York Post praised the film's acting but noted that the viewer "may end up feeling as suckered as Roy's victims." Lumenick did not enjoy the twist ending, believing that it was a large detractor to the film's value.

References

External links
 
 
 
 

2003 films
2003 black comedy films
2000s crime comedy-drama films
2000s heist films
American black comedy films
American crime comedy-drama films
American heist films
British black comedy films
British crime comedy-drama films
British heist films
Films about con artists
Films about obsessive–compulsive disorder
Films about Tourette syndrome
Films based on American novels
Films directed by Ridley Scott
Films scored by Hans Zimmer
Films with screenplays by Ted Griffin
Warner Bros. films
Scott Free Productions films
ImageMovers films
Lottery fraud in fiction
2003 comedy films
Films about father–daughter relationships
2000s English-language films
2000s American films
2000s British films